SCFG may refer to

 Stochastic context-free grammar, generative probability model that takes the shape of a context-free grammar
 Synchronous context-free grammar, in machine translation